is a railway station in the town of Misato, Akita Prefecture, Japan, operated by JR East. The station name origins from the historic battlefield of Gosannen War in the area.

Lines
Gosannen Station is served by the Ōu Main Line and is located 234.7 km from the terminus of the line at Fukushima Station.

Station layout
The station consists of one side platform and one island platform connected to the station building by a footbridge. The station is unattended.

Platforms

History
Gosannen Station opened on 12 December, 1921, as a station on the Japanese Government Railways (JGR), serving the village of Lizume. The JGR became the Japan National Railways (JNR) after World War II. The station was absorbed into the JR East network upon the privatization of the JNR on 1 April, 1987. A new station building was completed on 12 December, 2012.

Surrounding area
 Gosannen War Museum (後三年の役金沢資料館)

See also
List of railway stations in Japan

External links

 JR East Station information 

Railway stations in Japan opened in 1921
Railway stations in Akita Prefecture
Ōu Main Line
Misato, Akita